Arcuri is a surname. Notable people with the surname include:

A. J. Arcuri (born 1997), American football player
Alfie Arcuri (born 1988), Australian singer-songwriter
Felipe Arcuri (born 1974), Venezuelan musician, songwriter and composer
Jennifer Arcuri (born 1985), American businessperson, known for her connection with Boris Johnson
Manuela Arcuri (born 1977), Italian actress, model and soubrette
Mike Arcuri (born 1959), American politician